The Grand Prix scientifique de la Fondation Lefoulon-Delalande (Scientific Grand Prize of the Lefoulon-Delalande Foundation) is an award conferred annually by the Lefoulon-Delalande Foundation at the Institut de France. It is awarded in the areas of medical science, particularly cardiovascular science. Each year the prize has a different theme. The award has a €500,000 prize.

Laureates 
Winners of the prize are:

External links 
 http://lefoulon-delalande.institut-de-france.fr

References 

French science and technology awards
Institut de France